Alexander Budkin (born September 8, 1986) is a Russian professional ice hockey defenceman who is currently playing for HC Lada Togliatti in the Supreme Hockey League (VHL).

Playing career
Budkin began his professional career in 2003 playing for Traktor in his birth town of Chelyabinsk. After a year he moved to Kristall Saratov, then on to Dynamo Moscow. He remained at Dynamo Moscow until 2009 when he returned to Chelyabinsk for the 2009/10 season, although he had to open the season with Dynamo.  The following year he played just six games for Severstal Cherepovets before being traded to Spartak Moscow. In May 2013 he signed a contract to return to Dynamo Moscow.

In 2013 he joined Dynamo Moscow of the KHL, from Spartak Moscow. In November 2013 it was confirmed that he is being loaned to Russian Major League team Dynamo Balashikha.

Budkin was part of the winning Dynamo Moscow team for the 2008 Spengler Cup.

Career statistics

References

External links

1986 births
Living people
Sportspeople from Chelyabinsk
HC Dynamo Moscow players
HC Lada Togliatti players
Metallurg Magnitogorsk players
Russian ice hockey defencemen
Severstal Cherepovets players
HC Sochi players
HC Spartak Moscow players
Torpedo Nizhny Novgorod players
Traktor Chelyabinsk players